Black Mirror is a British science fiction anthology series created by Charlie Brooker. Premiering on 4 December 2011, the first two series aired on British network Channel 4, as did the special "White Christmas", whereas the following three series were released on the American streaming platform Netflix. There are twenty-two episodes in the show's first five series, and an additional interactive film Bandersnatch has also been released. Inspired by The Twilight Zone, each episode of Black Mirror is standalone and explores the common theme of technology and its side-effects.

Black Mirror has received positive reception from critics and has been nominated for eighty-three awards, winning twenty-three of them. The most acclaimed episodes are "USS Callister", which won four Emmy Awards, and "San Junipero", which won two. Additionally, the interactive film Black Mirror: Bandersnatch won two Emmy Awards. As actors rarely appear in more than one episode, the only people to receive multiple awards for their work on the show are writer Charlie Brooker, who has won seven, and executive producer Annabel Jones, who has won four. The series has been nominated for seventeen British Academy Film Awards, winning two, and fifteen Emmy Awards, winning nine.

Statistics

Episodes
Sixteen of the show's twenty-two episodes have received awards or nominations, including those given to specific people for their work on the episode. The interactive film Black Mirror: Bandersnatch has also received awards and nominations.

People

Fifteen people have received two or more nominations for their work on Black Mirror.

Art Directors Guild Awards
The Art Directors Guild present the ADG Excellence in Production Design Awards for American film, television and other media with outstanding production design.

BAFTA Awards
The British Academy of Film and Television Arts (BAFTA) was founded in 1947 under the name British Film Academy to recognise excellence in the British film industry. In 1958, they merged with the Guild of Television Producers and Directors, and began to give awards to British television programmes. In 2000, television awards were split into the British Academy Television Awards, given for work in production, and the British Academy Television Craft Awards, presented for technical achievements.

BAFTA Television Awards

BAFTA Television Craft Awards

Black Reel Awards
Established in 2000 and presented by the Foundation for the Augmentation of African-Americans in Film, the Black Reel Awards are presented for African-American excellence in film and television. Initially limited to Hollywood, awards are now given to worldwide media.

Broadcast Awards
The Broadcast Awards, associated with the magazine Broadcast, are a series of awards given to British television programmes.

Cinema Audio Society Awards
These awards are presented by the American Cinema Audio Society for sound mixing in film and television.

Emmy Awards
Emmy Awards are given by the Academy of Television Arts & Sciences, an organisation founded in 1946, for television shows broadcast or available for download and streaming in America. The main award ceremony is the Primetime Emmy Award, whilst Creative Arts Emmy Awards are given in technical, creative and craft categories, and International Emmy Awards are presented to shows airing outside of the U.S.

Emmy Awards

International Emmy Awards

Fangoria Chainsaw Awards
The Fangoria Chainsaw Awards are given to horror and thriller films. In association with the fan magazine Fangoria, the awards have been given annually since 1992.

Golden Reel Awards
The Golden Reel Awards are presented by the Motion Picture Sound Editors, an American organisation founded in 1953. The awards are given for excellence in sound editing.

Hugo Awards
The Hugo Awards are a series of science fiction awards which have been presented by the World Science Fiction Society since 1953. Formats recognised include literature, film and serial works.

IGN Awards
These awards are given by IGN Entertainment, an entertainment media company specialising in video games.

Producers Guild of America Awards
The Producers Guild of America have held annual awards to recognise American film, television and new media since 1990.

Saturn Awards
The Academy of Science Fiction, Fantasy and Horror Films present the Saturn Awards for works of science fiction, fantasy and horror. Since 1973, the awards have been presented to American films, television programmes and other media.

Visual Effects Society Awards
The American Visual Effects Society present the Visual Effects Society Awards to films, television shows, video games and commercials with outstanding visual effects.

Other awards

Notes

References

External links
 Black Mirror at Netflix
 Awards for Black Mirror at IMDb

Awards
Black Mirror